This is a list of important publications in cryptography, organized by field.

Some reasons why a particular publication might be regarded as important:
Topic creator – A publication that created a new topic
Breakthrough – A publication that changed scientific knowledge significantly
Influence – A publication which has significantly influenced the world or has had a massive impact on the teaching of cryptography.

Cryptanalysis

The index of coincidence and its applications in cryptology

Description: Presented the index of coincidence method for codebreaking; number 22 in the Riverbank Publications series.

Treatise on the Enigma

Description: The breaking of the Enigma.

The Codebreakers: The Story of Secret Writing

Description: Almost nothing had been published in cryptography in several decades and very few non-government researchers were thinking about it. The Codebreakers, a popular and non academic book,  made many more people aware and contains a lot of technical information, although it requires careful reading to extract it. Its 1967 appearance was followed by the appearance of many papers over the next few years.

Differential Cryptanalysis of DES-like Cryptosystems

Description: The method of differential cryptanalysis.

A new method for known plaintext attack of FEAL cipher

Description: The method of linear cryptanalysis.

Theory

Communication Theory of Secrecy Systems

Description: Information theory based analysis of cryptography. The original form of this paper was a confidential Bell Labs report from 1945, not the one published.

Probabilistic Encryption

Description: The paper provides a rigorous basis to encryption (e.g., partial information) and shows that it possible to equate the slightest cryptanalysis to solve a pure math problem. 
Second, it introduces the notion of computational indistinguishability.

Proofs that Yield Nothing But their Validity or All Languages in NP have Zero-Knowledge Proofs

Description: This paper explains how to construct a zero-knowledge proof system for any language in NP.

Private key cryptography

Cryptographic Coding for Data-Bank Privacy
 

Description: Feistel ciphers are a form of cipher of which DES is the most important. It would be hard to overestimate the importance of either Feistel or DES. Feistel pushed a transition from stream ciphers to block ciphers.  Although most ciphers operate on streams, most of the important ciphers today are block ciphers at their core.

Data Encryption Standard
 NBS Federal Standard  FIPS PUB 46, 15 Jan 1977.

Description: DES is not only one of the most widely deployed ciphers in the world but has had a profound impact on the development of cryptography. Roughly a generation of cryptographers devoted much of their time to attacking and improving DES.

Public Key Cryptography

New directions in cryptography
 

Description: This paper suggested public key cryptography and presented Diffie–Hellman key exchange. For more information about this work see: W.Diffie, M.E.Hellman, "Privacy and Authentication: An Introduction to Cryptography", in Proc. IEEE, Vol 67(3) Mar 1979, pp 397–427.

On the Signature Reblocking Problem in Public Key Cryptography

Description: In this paper (along with Loren M. Kohnfelder,"Using Certificates for Key Distribution in a Public-Key Cryptosystem", MIT Technical report 19 May 1978), Kohnfelder introduced certificates (signed messages containing public keys) which are the heart of all modern key management systems.

Secure Communications Over Insecure Channels
 

Description: This paper introduced a branch of public key cryptography, known as public key distribution systems. Merkle's work predated "New directions in cryptography" though it was published after it. The Diffie–Hellman key exchange is an implementation of such a Merkle system.  Hellman himself has argued that a more correct name would be Diffie–Hellman–Merkle key exchange.

A Method for Obtaining Digital Signatures and Public Key Cryptosystems
 

Description: The RSA encryption method. The first public-key encryption method.

How to Share a Secret
 

Description: A safe method for sharing a secret.

On the security of public key protocols

Description: Introduced the adversarial model against which almost all cryptographic protocols are judged.

Protocols

Using encryption for authentication in large networks of computers
 

Description: This paper introduced the basic ideas of cryptographic protocols and showed how both secret-key and public-key encryption could be used to achieve authentication.

Kerberos

Description: The Kerberos authentication protocol, which allows individuals communicating over an insecure network to prove their identity to one another in a secure and practical manner.

A Protocol for Packet Network Interconnection

A Dynamic Network Architecture

Description: Network software in distributed systems.

See also
Books on cryptography

References

The Codebreakers
https://users.cs.jmu.edu/abzugcx/public/Cryptology/Journal-Articles-on-Crypto-POSTED.pdf

 
History of computer science
Cryptography
Cryptography books